Over and Under is an album by folk singer/guitarist Greg Brown, released in 2000 on the Trailer Records label, a brief departure from his normal Red House Records label.

The album stemmed from Brown's desire of assembling an all-star band of Eastern Iowa musicians to make a rustic, “back-porch” record. All the songs were written in the three days following the Covenant sessions.

Reception

Music critic Jeff Burger praised the release in his Allmusic review, writing "...this is mostly terrific stuff. Brown's gravelly vocals are as good as ever, and so are his songs, which range from playful and silly to poignant and powerful." Jim Musser of No Depression described the album as "From touching (”Dear Wrinkled Face”) to “touched” (the perverse graveside huckstering of “Ina Bell Sale”), the homeys kick up sparks in a diverse, provocative set that corrals significant elements of the region’s [Iowa] mythos and ethos."

John Kenyon added Over and Under (and Covenant) to his list of the Top 10 of 2000, writing "Brown shows his raunchy side, growling through rockers and ravers, never losing his keen eye for detail or his lyrical dexterity."

Track listing
All songs by Greg Brown except as noted.
 "River Will Take You" – 3:31
 "Mattie Price" – 4:44
 "Summer Evening" – 3:41
 "Why Do You Even Say That" – 3:52
 "Shit Out of Luck" – 2:23
 "Beyond the Sunset" (Traditional) – 4:06
 "Fairfield" – 2:51
 "Almost Out of Gas" – 2:34
 "Betty Ann" – 3:41
 "857-5413" – 2:44
 "Your Town Now" – 3:56
 "Dear Wrinkled Face" – 3:04
 "Inabell Sale" – 4:08
 "Like a Dog" – 2:59

Personnel
Greg Brown – vocals, guitar
Bob Black – banjo, lap steel guitar
Steve Hayes – drums, percussion
Dave Moore – harmonica, button accordion
David Zollo – piano
Bo Ramsey – guitar
Al Murphy – fiddle, mandolin

References

Greg Brown (folk musician) albums
2000 albums